Burn is a 2019 American black comedy thriller film written and directed by Mike Gan. It stars Tilda Cobham-Hervey, Suki Waterhouse, Harry Shum Jr., Shiloh Fernandez and Josh Hutcherson.

It was released on August 23, 2019, by Momentum Pictures.

Plot
Melinda begins the graveyard shift as an attendant at a gas station. Lonely and introverted, she doesn't object when her coworker Sheila, who has an attitude, mentions the toilets need cleaning. Later, while taking a break, she searches through her phone for photos of a police officer she has been discreetly photographing.
 
Sheila tries to get Melinda to do some dance moves, then films them, much to Melinda's disgust. An older repeat customer offers Sheila a pair of shoe insoles to ease her standing all night, but Sheila is creeped out, having seen the man many times before. They fit Melinda however, and she tries to make amends with the dejected man as he walks outside, to no avail.

A man named Billy parks his stolen vehicle outside and enters the store with a concealed handgun. A police officer named Liu pulls up and strikes up a conversation with Melinda. Later, as Liu purchases coffee, Melinda takes a photo of him and Sheila catches her in the act. Melinda drops her phone, breaking the screen, and Liu consoles her before being called away on an alert. Sheila bullies Melinda into showing her the multiple photos she's taken of Liu.

Upon returning from a smoke break, Melinda finds Billy engaging Sheila in a stick up. In a rather jovial manner, he demands cash and demonstrates that his gun is real by firing it when she doubts him. Billy is disappointed by the small amount of cash in the register and Melinda offers to empty the safe for him. Returning with a backpack of money, she tells Billy she wants to go with him and a struggle ensues when she refuses to hand over the backpack until he agrees. Billy wrestles the backpack from Melinda, but Sheila berates him with profanities as he leaves, angering him. He grabs her and forces her to the ground, ordering Melinda to lock the doors and go into the bathrooms.

Billy hauls Sheila to the break room and begins beating her, but Melinda sneaks up behind him and throws the pot of coffee in his face. Scalded, he accidentally fires his gun, killing Sheila before Melinda hits him over the head with a fire extinguisher, knocking him out. When he awakens, he finds himself strapped to a chair as Melinda quietly mops up the blood, having wrapped Sheila's body in a tarp.

Melinda and Billy converse and she gets him a cigarette, aspirin and water. She gives him some pills, but he realises that she has given him cheap erectile medication instead of aspirin. She proceeds to tape his eyes and mouth shut and attempts to rape him. He struggles and he is able to rip the tape holding one of his arms, knocking Melinda away. Still blind, he tries chasing after her, but ends up knocking himself out again. Melinda pockets his gun, takes the backpack and cleans up the room.

Melinda quietly unlocks the front door for a customer, who berates her for not having any coffee.  Reaching her limit, Melinda puts the gun up to her chin briefly before breaking down and sobbing, telling the customer to leave her alone. Perry, Sheila's boyfriend, then shows up to give her a ride home and finds her phone on the floor. In desperation, Melinda tells him that Sheila left with another man, but doesn't know where they went.

Once Perry leaves, Melinda steps out back to find somewhere to bury the bodies when the bikers arrive looking for Billy. She claims not to have seen him and won't let them enter the store. After an armed standoff, the bikers leave.

Realising she cannot access the surveillance data to destroy it, Melinda begins filling containers with gasoline. Liu then returns, recognizing Billy's car as stolen. He questions Melinda, who says she hasn't seen anything suspicious, but Liu calls the manager for access to the surveillance data.  Melinda fails to stop Liu from searching the store, but finding nothing, he leaves. Billy has escaped, leaving only zip ties behind.

Melinda begins dousing the store with gasoline when she hears Billy entering the store and hides. He disables the power, which locks the front doors just as Perry returns, suspicious about Sheila's disappearance. Billy escapes through the back door and barricades it with dumpsters before strangling Perry. Melinda calls Liu and admits she needs help as Billy rams Perry's car into the front doors, shattering the glass.

Backed into a corner, Melinda pleads with Billy to simply take the money and leave, but he wants revenge. He fires his gun, which ignites the gas and engulfs him in flames. Melinda grabs a fire extinguisher and escapes through the front door as Liu and other officers arrive. He helps Melinda into his car and comforts her, Melinda believing she has finally found somebody who cares.

Cast

Production
In February 2018, it was announced Tilda Cobham-Hervey, Suki Waterhouse and Josh Hutcherson had joined the cast of the film, with Mike Gan directing from a screenplay he wrote. In March 2018, it was announced Shiloh Fernandez and Harry Shum Jr. joined the cast of the film. In May 2018, it was announced the film had been re-titled from Plume to Burn.

Filming
Principal photography began in March 2018.

Release
It was released on August 23, 2019, by Momentum Pictures.

Reception

Box office
Burn grossed nothing in North America and $25,373 in other territories.

Critical response
On Metacritic, the film has a score of 50 out of 100, based on 4 critics, indicating "mixed or average reviews".

Dennis Harvey of Variety wrote: "The problem is that writer-director Mike Gan’s first feature, though competently handled in most departments, doesn’t commit enough to any approach to fulfill its potential."
John DeFore of The Hollywood Reporter wrote: "Neither Gan's screenplay nor his direction of the cast quite sells this scenario, but once he introduces some accidental violence, the picture can ride the familiar logic of crime-gone-wrong storytelling."

References

External links
 
 
 

2019 films
2019 thriller films
American thriller films
Films shot in New York (state)
2010s English-language films
2010s American films